KIXA (106.5 FM) is a commercial radio station in Lucerne Valley, California, broadcasting to the Victor Valley, California area. KIXA airs a classic rock music format branded as 106.5 The Fox.

It was operated as "KIX 106", a country music station, from 1992 until 1997.  The first format change in 1998 was made to "Rock 106", where the station played a mix of classic rock from the 1960s and alternative rock from the 1990s.  The station was also simulcast on KIXW-FM and KIXF-FM to cover Victor Valley, Barstow and Baker.  When Rock 106.5 was shut down in 2002, Clear Channel sold off the repeater stations to Westwood One (who later sold the stations to Heftel Broadcasting, the current owners of KIXW-FM), and relaunched KIXA-FM as a classic rock station.

Since 2002, KIXA has aired a classic rock music format branded as "The Fox", removing alternative and modern hard rock acts from its catalog.  After Clear Channel sold the station to El Dorado Broadcasters in 2006 (after the company went private), the station updated its classic rock presentation in the late 2000s to include music from the 1960s to the early 1990s, while still excluding alternative rock and modern hard rock.  The station performs older hard rock, glam metal, and arena rock acts from that period only.

References

External links
 
 

IXA
Classic rock radio stations in the United States
Mass media in San Bernardino County, California
Victor Valley
Radio stations established in 1992
1992 establishments in California